The Tervajoki railway station is located in the municipality of Isokyrö, Finland, in the urban area of Tervajoki (specifically, the village of Kylkkälä). It is located along the Seinäjoki–Vaasa railway, and its neighboring stations are Seinäjoki in the east and Vaasa in the west.

Services 

Tervajoki is served by all long-distance trains (InterCity and Pendolino) that use the Seinäjoki–Vaasa line; the routes include Helsinki–Vaasa and Seinäjoki–Vaasa. It is the only intermediate station on the line, after the closings of Laihia, Ylistaro and Isokyrö on 20 June 2016. All trains arriving to and departing from the station use track 1.

References 

Isokyrö
Railway stations in South Ostrobothnia